Neoregelia gigas is a species of flowering plant in the ggenus Neoregelia. This species is endemic to Brazil.

References

gigas
Flora of Brazil